Jacksboro Independent School District is a public school district based in Jacksboro, Texas (USA).

Located in Jack County, small portions of the district extend into Wise and Archer counties.

In 2009, the school district was rated "academically acceptable" by the Texas Education Agency.

Schools
Jacksboro High School (Grades 9-12)
1962 and 1971 Class 2A State Football champions
Jacksboro Middle School (Grades 6-8)
Jacksboro Elementary School (Grades PK-5)

References

External links
Jacksboro ISD

School districts in Jack County, Texas
School districts in Wise County, Texas
School districts in Archer County, Texas